Jessica Taylor (born 27 June 1988 in Manchester) is a British track and field athlete who competes in the heptathlon. At the 2014 Commonwealth Games held in Glasgow, Taylor represented England and finished third in the women's heptathlon.

References

External links

1988 births
Living people
English heptathletes
British female athletes
Commonwealth Games gold medallists for England
Athletes (track and field) at the 2014 Commonwealth Games
Sportspeople from Manchester
Commonwealth Games bronze medallists for England
Commonwealth Games medallists in athletics
Medallists at the 2014 Commonwealth Games